Eleanor Marie Uhl (March 21, 1902 – July 21, 1981), also known by her married name Eleanor Gash, was an American competition swimmer who represented the United States as an 18-year-old at the 1920 Summer Olympics in Antwerp, Belgium.  Uhl competed in the women's 300-meter freestyle, advanced to the event final, and finished fifth overall.

References

External links

1902 births
1981 deaths
American female freestyle swimmers
Olympic swimmers of the United States
Swimmers from Philadelphia
Swimmers at the 1920 Summer Olympics
20th-century American women
20th-century American people